Rugby (Sevens and Union) was one of the many sports which was held at the 2002 Asian Games in Ulsan, South Korea. All games played at the Ulsan Public Stadium. The competition included only men's events.

Schedule

Medalists

Union

Sevens

Medal table

Draw
The teams were drawn into two groups of four teams for sevens competition, rugby union competitions were played in round robin format.

Group A

Group B

Final standing

Union

Sevens

References
2002 Asian Games Official Report, Pages 568–569

External links
 2002 Asian Games website

 
rugby union
2002
2002 rugby union tournaments for national teams
International rugby union competitions hosted by South Korea
2002 in Asian rugby union